Ceratozamia mixeorum is a species of plant in the family Zamiaceae. It is endemic to the Sierra Mixe of Oaxaca state in southern Mexico.  Its natural habitat is subtropical or tropical moist montane forests.

References

mixeorum
Endemic flora of Mexico
Flora of Oaxaca
Endangered biota of Mexico
Endangered plants
Taxonomy articles created by Polbot
Flora of the Sierra Madre de Oaxaca